Ludoș (Transylvanian Saxon dialect: Logdes) is a commune located in Sibiu County, Transylvania, Romania, bordering Alba County. It is composed of two villages, Gusu and Ludoș.

Natives
 Octavian Smigelschi

References

External links 

Communes in Sibiu County
Localities in Transylvania